Pulsnitz or Połčnica (Upper Sorbian) is a town in the district of Bautzen, in the Free State of Saxony, Germany. It is situated on the small river Pulsnitz, 11 km southwest of Kamenz, and 24 km northeast of the centre of Dresden.

Pulsnitz became famous for its Pfefferkuchen, a type of Christmas cookie, when in 1558 the bakers of Pulsnitz received permission to bake them. Today there are still eight Pfefferküchlereien bakeries. In 1745 the Pfefferküchler Tobias Thomas was known to be practising his craft in Pulsnitz as well as in Thorn, Prussia now Toruń, Poland, where the famous Thorner Kathrinchen were made. Pulsnitz is informally known as Pfefferkuchenstadt meaning "Gingerbread Town".

The first Protestant missionary to arrive in India, Bartholomäus Ziegenbalg was born in Pulsnitz on July 10, 1682. The town Pulsnitz absorbed the former municipality Friedersdorf in 1994, and Oberlichtenau in 2009.

Gallery

Notable people 

 Bartholomäus Ziegenbalg (1682-1719), first Protestant missionary and Indian linguist
 Ernst Rietschel, one of the most important sculptors of his time 
 Julius Kühn, an important agricultural scientist, he founded the first agricultural institute to be taken seriously at a German university
 Curt Haase, politician (NSDAP)
 Klaus Staeck, graphic artist
 Linda Wenzel

References

External links
  

 
Populated places in Bautzen (district)
West Lusatia